Satyasagara is a Singaporean football coach and former footballer.

Managerial career
Satyasagara was appointed head coach of Chennai City in December 2020.

In March 2022, he was appointed as the head coach of Lao League 1 side Young Elephants FC.

References

Living people
1964 births
Singaporean footballers
Singaporean football managers
Chennai City FC head coaches
Singaporean people of Tamil descent
Singaporean sportspeople of Indian descent
Expatriate football managers in India